Sheepshanks is a small lunar impact crater located near the northern edge of Mare Frigoris. Due south on the opposite shore is the prominent crater Aristoteles while to the north is C. Mayer. Sheepshanks appears somewhat oblong due to foreshortening, but it is actually nearly circular. The inner walls slope down to a ring of material around the inner floor. There is a small craterlet along the southeastern inner wall. The crater is otherwise not particularly eroded by impacts.

About  to the southeast of the crater rim is the western end of the narrow rille named Rima Sheepshanks.

The craters are named for Anne Sheepshanks who was a benefactor to the Royal Astronomical Society. Despite being overlooked for membership of the society her contribution is recorded in the naming of these craters.

Satellite craters
By convention these features are identified on lunar maps by placing the letter on the side of the crater midpoint that is closest to Sheepshanks.

References

 
 
 
 
 
 
 
 
 
 
 
 

Impact craters on the Moon